Michał Misiurewicz (born 9 November 1948) is a Polish mathematician. He is known for his contributions to chaotic dynamical systems and fractal geometry, notably the Misiurewicz point.

Misiurewicz participated in the International Mathematical Olympiad for Poland, winning a bronze medal in 1965 and a gold medal (with perfect score and special prize) in 1966. He earned his Doctorate from University of Warsaw under supervision of Bogdan Bojarski.

In 1990 he moved to the United States, where he visited Northwestern University and Princeton University, eventually settling down at Indiana University–Purdue University Indianapolis at Indianapolis, Indiana, where he currently is a professor.

In 2012 he became a fellow of the American Mathematical Society.

See also
 Mandelbrot set
 Complex quadratic polynomial
 Conley index theory
 Topological entropy
 Rotation number
 Rule 90

References

External links
Website at IUPUI

1948 births
Living people
Polish mathematicians
University of Warsaw alumni
Indiana University–Purdue University Indianapolis faculty
Scientists from Warsaw
Fellows of the American Mathematical Society
International Mathematical Olympiad participants